Stop Me If You've Heard This (and variations) may refer to:

Stop Me If You've Heard This: A History and Philosophy of Jokes, 2008 non-fiction book by Jim Holt
Stop Me If You've Heard This One, 1940s radio comedy series
Stop Me If You've Heard This One Before, 2008 novel by David Yoo
"Stop Me (If You've Heard it All Before)", 1976 song by Billy Ocean
"Stop Me If You Think You've Heard This One Before", 1987 song by the Smiths
Stop Me If You Think You've Heard This One Before..., 2003 compilation covers album

See also 
Stop Us If You've Heard This One Before, 2012 compilation album by Barenaked Ladies
Stop Us If You've Heard This One Before, Vol 1., 2008 covers album by The Wildhearts